Progeny is a 1998 American science fiction film. It was directed by Brian Yuzna and written by Aubrey Solomon and Stuart Gordon. The film stars Arnold Vosloo as Dr. Craig Burton, Jillian McWhirter as Sherry Burton, Brad Dourif as Dr. Bert Clavell and Lindsay Crouse as Dr. Susan Lamarche.

Plot
Sherry Craig, a professional woman, happily discovers she is pregnant. While this is happy news for her and her husband Craig who is a doctor, both begin having strange memories from the night of conception. Uneasiness then becomes terror when both are convinced that she is carrying something alien inside her body. Sherry's therapist Dr. Susan Lamarche believes that Sherry has a psychological problem, for which Craig is to blame.

The couple contact a UFO/Paranormal college professor , who takes Sherry back to the night she conceived through hypnosis. They discover that she was abducted by aliens and artificially impregnated. The viewer is shown this sequence several times, with each time showing that Sherry blocked or distorted certain parts of the event in an attempt to accept and understand what was being done to her.

Cast
 Arnold Vosloo as Dr. Craig Burton
 Jillian McWhirter as Sherry Burton
 Brad Dourif as Dr. Bert Clavell
 Lindsay Crouse as Dr. Susan Lamarche
 Wilford Brimley as Dr. David Wetherly
 Willard E. Pugh as Eric Davidson
 David Wells as Dr. Duke Kelly
 Jan Hoag as Nurse Ida
 Don Calfa as Jimmy Stevens
 Timilee Romolini as Devon Thompson
 Nora Paradiso as Karen Boglia
 Patty Toy as Nurse Jane
 Susan Ripaldi as Nurse Della
 Barry Morris as Immigration Officer
 Logan Yuzna as Boy Patient
 Pancho Demmings as Officer McGuire
 Lisa Crosato as Bev

Production
The scene in which Sherry is probed by a little tube coming out of the wall and penetrating her vagina was a Jillian McWhirter's idea.

Nominations 
Brian Yuzna nominated at the 1998 International Fantasy Film Award, Porto, Portugal.

References

External links

 

1998 films
1990s science fiction horror films
Alien abduction films
American science fiction horror films
American pregnancy films
1990s English-language films
Films directed by Brian Yuzna
1990s American films